John Hume Burges (26 October 1928 – 14 January 2015) was an Irish rugby union player who played in the scrum-half position. He was educated at St John's School, Leatherhead and was capped twice for Ireland.

References

1928 births
2015 deaths
Ireland international rugby union players
People educated at St John's School, Leatherhead
Rugby union players from County Tipperary
Rugby union scrum-halves